Antonio Rodriguez is a serial entrepreneur and venture capitalist.

Early life and education 
Rodriguez was born in Venezuela. At the age of nine, he learned to program on an Apple II. He graduated with honors from Harvard University with an A.B. in Social Studies in 1996. After working for two years (see below) he returned to university to complete an MBA at Stanford University Graduate School of Business over the period 1998 to 2000.

Career 
After a job with Boston Consulting Group, he worked at Abuzz Technologies, a social Q&A site that was founded by his brother Andres and acquired by The New York Times in 1999. In 2000, he founded a company, Memora, with his brother. The company built and sold a home server called Servio. It closed in 2001 with the bursting of the dot-com bubble. He moved to New York to join MyPublisher (now part of Shutterfly) which manufactures photo books. In 2005 he founded Tabblo, a photo storyboarding website and printing company, and was CEO. It was acquired by Hewlett-Packard in 2007. After the acquisition, he became CTO of HP's consumer printing group.

He joined Matrix Partners as a general partner in 2010. His investments there include Sold (acquired by Dropbox in 2013), The Echo Nest in 2010 (acquired by Spotify in 2014), Oculus VR in 2013 (acquired by Facebook for about $2.3bn in 2014), and Owl Labs in 2016.

Corporate governance 
Rodriguez holds a seat on the board of directors of Adelphic, Almond Systems, Care.com, Flatiron School, Intent Media, Markforged, Oculus VR, and Sqrrl.

In academia 
He was a judge in the 2012 MIT Auto-ID Labs Big Data Conference, run by the Industrial Liaison Program at MIT. He was cited for his opinions on software development by Laseter et al. in a MIT Sloan Management Review.

Personal life 
Rodriguez is married with two sons.

References

External links 
 Blog archive 2003-2004
 Blog archive 2005-2009

Living people
American technology executives
Harvard University alumni
Stanford Graduate School of Business alumni
Year of birth missing (living people)